Love in Kilnerry is a 2022 American romance comedy film written, produced, and directed by Daniel Keith in his directorial debut. The film stars Keith, Kathy Searle, Roger Hendricks Simon, James Patrick Nelson, Sybil Lines, Sheila Stasack, and Tony Triano. The first draft edit of the film played to peers in the US on October 18, 2019, at the New Hampshire Film Festival and the San Diego International Film Festival simultaneously. The film went through two more years of edits and reshoots before being completed in 2021. Archway Pictures released the film theatrically in North America in limited cities starting April 8 and a wide release on May 13, 2022. It played in over 100 cities for 21 weeks against the summer blockbusters, like Top Gun: Maverick, Jurassic Dominion, Dr. Strange, and Elvis.

The comedy's narrative is focused on the fictional town of Kilnerry, New Hampshire, whose residents panic after the Environmental Protection Agency informs them that mandatory changes to their chemical plant could dramatically increase their sexual libido. Love in Kilnerry and Keith received critical acclaim and forty-five film festival awards and twenty-six nominations for Best Screenplay, Best Director, Best Film, Best Actors, Best Cinematography, and Best Ensemble.

Plot
The small sleepy remote town of Kilnerry struggles as most of the residents are elderly and the younger ones will be going off to college soon. When a representative from the EPA visits the town's quarterly townhall meeting to tell them their chemical plant has been polluting the waters and creating toxic fish, they learn a new mandatory process, called P172, must be adapted by the plant. However, there is one small side effect. When exposed to P172, laboratory rats have shown a dramatic increase in sexual libido. The residents panic and chaos ensues. The sheriff struggles to maintain order over the following months as chaos and mayhem ensue; a catastrophic orgy attempt, indecent exposure, the priest becomes a nudist to be closer to God, and some of the more decrepit residents compete in a dance competition with a risqué performance. Just as the sheriff has reached his breaking point in an effort to control everyone and keep the town from changing, the EPA returns to inform them that they discovered the rats had been used in a previous pheromone test and that P172 has no side effects. Plagued with guilt, they realize that by thinking they had no control, they learned to open up, accept others, throw caution to the wind and live again, and fall in love. The sheriff is faced with his actions and apologizes to the town. The residents go on to embrace a new life and create new destinies.

Cast

Daniel Keith as Gary O'Reilly, the town sheriff
Kathy Searle as Nessa Ward, the corky paper shop owner
Roger Hendricks Simon as Fergal O'Reilly, the town postman
James Patrick Nelson as Father Wesley O'Dell
Debargo Sanyal as Rakesh Nibhanupudi, a spokesperson from the Environmental Protection Agency
Tony Triano as Jerry Boylan, the town mayor and pub owner
Sybil Lines as Aednat McLaughlin, a religious reclusive widow
Sheila Stasack as Brigid Kerry, the town gossip and general store owner

Production and distribution

Development

Love in Kilnerry was originally a play, written by Keith, that takes place in the fictional town of Kilnerry in County Donegal. It was a challenge presented to him by Royal Shakespeare Company alumnus Sybil Lines (who went on to play Aednat McLaughlin). Keith wanted to write something that would make his grandmother laugh. He used a pen name, Colin Filmore, so the actors could approach the material more honestly as to not be intimidated by the writer present. The play was workshopped in front of audiences at Manhattan Theater Club Studios in New York City for most of 2016. It wasn't until 2017, when Keith wrote the story as a screenplay, that the cast learned who the real writer was. Keith traveled up and down the east coast looking at dozens of small towns until he found a postcard of Portsmouth. Upon visiting the small seaside town, Keith knew he had found "[his] Kilnerry". Daniel Keith, Roger Hendricks Simon, Sybil Lines, and Sheila Stasack, who had workshopped the play in 2016, continued on to the film. Kathy Searle, Tony Triano, Debargo Sanyal, Jeremy Fernandez, and James Patrick Nelson were cast by Kimberly Graham. Keith requested all theater actors since he wanted the film to have a theater-esque and storybook look and feel about it.

Filming

Keith knew he wanted a storybook town that was cut off from the rest of the world, so he reached out to visual effects artist Brian Demetz to create mountains around the town and erase anything modern (e.g. jeans, construction, tattoos, iPhones, new cars). The establishing and drone shots were the first to be filmed. Many of the residents of Portsmouth became the residents of Kilnerry, and brought the members of the production food, helped them find locations, and even housed many of them. A cast and crew of 200 people filmed in 28 locations. The Irish Post caught wind of Keith's film and released a story on December 15, 2017, about the Irish town of Ringaskiddy in County Cork, whose residents were complaining about the fumes of the local Pfizer plant, that made Viagra, and was causing the men and dogs to walk around sexually excited. The article said that "art could be imitating life".

Post-production
Post-production spanned throughout 2018 as Keith sought Jon Wilson to edit the film at Pinewood Studios in London, the music was written and performed by the score composer Randy Edelman, visual FX were created by Brian DeMetz, and colored by Andrew Geary at Company 3. Early edits of the film were shown to audiences at film festivals throughout 2019 as peer reviews. The film, its crews, and actors garnered forty-five awards and twenty-six nominations internationally. Tania Fisher wrote that "The only explanation that can be given to the deeply felt emotions from people who are somehow relating to an incredibly unlikely scenario is that Daniel has the power and skill to zero-in on human fears and relationships."

Distribution

The global COVID-19 pandemic halted the industry in April 2020 and it wasn't until July 2021 that Mutiny Pictures acquired North American distribution rights with the intention of putting the movie in theaters nationwide in early 2022. In 2022, Daniel Keith was granted the p.g.a. mark from the Producers Guild of America to be used in the film credits for his extensive work as one of the film's producers. His company, Archway Pictures, then took over theatrical distribution from Mutiny Pictures.

Portsmouth, New Hampshire Early Release
As a way of thanking the residents of Portsmouth, New Hampshire, for not only appearing in the film but also helping make it, Archway Pictures released the film early for one day only on April 9, 2022. Mayor Deaglan McEachern signed a proclamation renaming Portsmouth on April 9 of every year and declaring every April 9 "Kilnerry Day". The businesses in the downtown Market Square changed their names and Portsmouth Brewery created the Kilnerry Ale. The executive producer, and local resident of Portsmouth, Steve Scott, told the Foster's Daily Democrat, "The folks from the film usually come into a community (and hear) 'They're blocking my streets with actors again making a quick buck.' Here they were greeted with open arms. Who gets a city to change its name! Who gets to do that?"

Accolades 

Note: These accolades were awarded to early edits of the film.

References

External links
 
 
 Rotten Tomatoes

2022 films
2022 romantic comedy films
American romantic comedy films
Films scored by Randy Edelman
2020s English-language films
2020s American films